The Grand Order of Water Rats is a British entertainment industry fraternity and charitable organisation based in London. Founded in 1889 by the music hall comedians Joe Elvin and Jack Lotto, the order is known for its high-profile membership and benevolent works (primarily within the performing industries).

Origin

In 1889, two British music hall performers, Joe Elvin and Jack Lotto, owned a trotting pony called "Magpie". As the pony was a regular race winner, its owners decided that they would use the profits to help performers who were less fortunate than themselves. One day, as Elvin was driving the pony back to its stables in the pouring rain, a passing bus driver called out, "Wot yer got there, mate?" "Our trotting pony!" replied Elvin. Observing the bedraggled, soaked condition of the pony, the driver shouted back, "Trotting pony? Looks more like a bleedin' water rat!" As Rats spelled backwards is Star, and vole, another name for a water rat, is an anagram of love, the name was deemed appropriate for the Order's agenda of Brotherly Love. Their motto was: Philanthropy, conviviality and social intercourse.

The charity raises money by organising shows, lunches, dinners and other events. The objectives of the charity are "to assist members of the theatrical profession, or their dependents, who, due to illness or old age are in need." When possible additional funds raised go to a diverse range of charities and good causes including hospitals, health charities and benevolent funds. A member of the public can become a Friend of the Water Rats.

The Water Rats originally held meetings in Sunbury-on-Thames in a public house called The Magpie. Their headquarters is now at The Water Rats pub in Gray's Inn Road in Kings Cross, London.

Members

Membership is limited to 180 male members of the entertainment industry plus 20 Companion Rats. Some Water Rats are household names but many are not, but all must be respected and trusted by their peers. Joining the Order is a complicated process that involves finding a proposer and seconder within the Order, consideration by the Order's Grand Council and finally a vote which needs a large majority for success.

Members of the order wear a small gold emblem shaped as a water rat on the left lapel of their jackets, and if one Water Rat meets another who is not wearing his emblem he is fined, with the money going to charity. Magician David Nixon wore his while appearing on television, explaining that as current King Rat he could be fined by any other member who saw him on screen without it.

There is also a small number of Companion Rats, distinguished men from various fields of business and influence who are not performers but who have achieved recognition for their support and friendship of the Order. These include Bob Potter OBE, the late Prince Philip, Duke of Edinburgh, King Charles III and Prince Michael of Kent.

King Rats
The first King Rat, who is the head of the charity, was the music hall singer Harry Freeman. The comedian Dan Leno joined in 1890 and was King Rat in 1891, 1892 and 1897. The post is usually held for one year.

Previous King Rats include:

 1890 Harry Freeman
 1891 Dan Leno
 1892 Dan Leno
 1893 Wal Pink
 1894 Joe Elvin
 1895 J. W. Cragg
 1896 Eugene Stratton
 1897 Dan Leno
 1898 Joe O'Gorman (senior)
 1899 Paul Martinetti
 1900 Eugene Stratton
 1901 Joe O'Gorman
 1902 Wal Pink
 1903 Fred Russell
 1904 Tom McNaughton
 1905 Arthur Reece
 1906 Little Tich
 1907 J. Allison
 1908 W. H. Clemart
 1909 Fred Ginnett
 1910 C. Warren
 1911 Harry Tate
 1912 Charles Austin
 1913 Charles Austin
 1914 Fred Russell
 1915 William Bankier
 1916 Lew Lake
 1917 Lew Lake
 1918 Charles Austin
 1919 William Bankier
 1920 Deane Tribune
 1921 George D'Albert
World Upheaval – Lodge suspended until 1927
 1927 Charles Austin
 1928 Charles Austin
 1929 Fred Russell
 1930 Talbot O'Farrell
 1931 Will Hay
 1932 Charles Austin
 1933 Joe Morrison
 1934 Will Fyffe
 1935 Marriott Edgar
 1936 George Wood
 1937 Stanley Damerell
 1938 Fred Miller
 1939 Fred Russell
 1940 Will Hay
 1941 John Sharman
 1942 George Jackley
 1943 Tom Moss
 1944 George Doonan
 1945 Bud Flanagan
 1946 Teddy Brown (died) / Bud Flanagan
 1947 Robb Wilton
 1948 Albert Whelan
 1949 Ted Ray
 1950 Ted Ray
 1951 Bud Flanagan
 1952 Charlie Chester
 1953 Ben Warriss
 1954 George Elrick
 1955 Tommy Trinder
 1956 Dave O'Gorman
 1957 Cyril Dowler
 1958 Clarkson Rose
 1959 Johnny Riscoe
 1960 Arthur Scott
 1961 Ben Warriss
 1962 Ben Warriss
 1963 Tommy Trinder
 1964 Ted Ray
 1965 Tommy Trinder
 1966 Arthur Haynes
 1967 Terry Cantor
 1968 Frankie Vaughan
 1969 Harry Seltzer
 1970 Phil Hindin
 1971 George Martin
 1972 Albert Stevenson
 1973 George Elrick
 1974 Cyril Dowler
 1975 Joe Church
 1976 David Nixon
 1977 David Nixon
 1978 Donald Ross
 1979 David Berglas
 1980 Henry Cooper
 1981 Declan Cluskey
 1982 Charlie Smithers
 1983 Len Lowe
 1984 Davy Kaye
 1985 Les Dawson
 1986 Alan Freeman
 1987 Danny La Rue
 1988 Bernard Bresslaw
 1989 Roy Hudd
 1990 David Lodge
 1991 Wyn Calvin
 1992 Bert Weedon
 1993 John Inman
 1994 Roger De Courcey
 1995 Paul Daniels
 1996 Paul Daniels
 1997 Alf Pearson
 1998 Frankie Vaughan
 1999 Gorden Kaye
 2000 Roy Hudd
 2001 Don Smoothey
 2002 Keith Simmons
 2003 Chas McDevitt
 2004 Chas McDevitt
 2005 Melvyn Hayes
 2006 Kaplan Kaye
 2007 Kaplan Kaye
 2008 Kaplan Kaye
 2009 Graham Cole
 2010 Derek Martin
 2011 Keith Simmons
 2012 Joe Pasquale
 2013 Jess Conrad
 2014 Rick Wakeman
 2015 Rick Wakeman
 2016 Ian Richards
 2017 Ian Richards
 2018 Adger Brown
 2019 Nicholas Parsons
 2020 Duggie Brown
 2021 Duggie Brown
 2022 Duggie  Brown
 2023 Chris Emmett

Grand Order of Lady Ratlings
The Grand Order of Lady Ratlings (GOLR), a sister organisation for female performers and for wives, sisters and daughters of male performers, was established in 1929, when Fred Russell was King Rat of the GOWR.  His wife, Lillian Russell, was installed as the first Queen Ratling.  From 1965, membership was restricted to "recognised performers, those directly connected with the theatrical profession, wives of Water Rats and Companion Rats."   In 1931, Minnie O'Farrell, the wife of Talbot O'Farrell, initiated the 'Cup of Kindness', which subsequently became a recognised charity.

Publication 
The Trap was the official publication of the Grand Order of Water Rats.

References

External links
 Grand Order of Water Rats website
 
 Rick Wakeman elected King Rat by Grand Order of Water Rats at Freemasonry Today

Charities based in London
Fraternal orders
1889 establishments in the United Kingdom
Organizations established in 1889
Secret societies in the United Kingdom